Anderson Da Silva (born May 12, 1975) is a Brazilian footballer who plays as a defender for Madiun Putra.

Career in Indonesia 
Anderson began his career in Indonesia where he joined PSS Sleman after being recruited from the CFZ do Rio in Rio de Janeiro. In 2008, he moved to the city of Surabaya exactly in the Persebaya Surabaya. In the 2010–11 season, he played for the club Mitra Kukar. In opening season 2011–12 he moved to Persik Kediri.

External links 
Profile at liga-indonesia.co.id

1975 births
Living people
Brazilian footballers
Expatriate footballers in Indonesia
Association football defenders
PSS Sleman players
Persebaya Surabaya players
Sportspeople from Rio de Janeiro (state)